Park County is a county located in the U.S. state of Colorado. As of the 2020 census, the population was 17,390. The county seat is Fairplay. The county was named after the large geographic region known as South Park, which was named by early fur traders and trappers in the area.

Park County is included in the Denver-Aurora-Lakewood, CO Metropolitan Statistical Area. A majority of the county lies within the boundaries of the South Park National Heritage Area.

The geographic center of the State of Colorado is located in Park County.

Geography

The headwaters of the South Platte River are in Park County.

Adjacent counties
Clear Creek County - north
Jefferson County - northeast
Teller County - east
Fremont County - southeast
Chaffee County - southwest
Lake County - west
Summit County - northwest

Major Highways
  U.S. Highway 24
  U.S. Highway 285
  State Highway 9

National protected areas
Buffalo Peaks Wilderness
Lost Creek Wilderness
Pike National Forest
San Isabel National Forest

State protected areas
Eleven Mile State Park
Spinney Mountain State Park
Staunton State Park

Trails and byways
American Discovery Trail
Colorado Trail
Continental Divide National Scenic Trail
Great Parks Bicycle Route
Guanella Pass Scenic Byway
TransAmerica Trail Bicycle Route

Demographics

As of the census of 2000, there were 14,523 people, 5,894 households, and 4,220 families living in the county. The population density was 7 people per square mile (3/km2). There were 10,697 housing units at an average density of 5 per square mile (2/km2). The racial makeup of the county was 95.07% White, 0.50% Black or African American, 0.92% Native American, 0.41% Asian, 0.03% Pacific Islander, 1.23% from other races, and 1.84% from two or more races.  4.32% of the population were Hispanic or Latino of any race.

There were 5,894 households, out of which 30.20% had children under the age of 18 living with them, 64.10% were married couples living together, 4.40% had a female householder with no husband present, and 28.40% were non-families. 21.10% of all households were made up of individuals, and 3.20% had someone living alone who was 65 years of age or older. The average household size was 2.45 and the average family size was 2.86.

In the county, the population was spread out, with 23.50% under the age of 18, 5.10% from 18 to 24, 33.40% from 25 to 44, 30.60% from 45 to 64, and 7.30% who were 65 years of age or older. The median age was 40 years. For every 100 females there were 107.10 males. For every 100 females age 18 and over, there were 107.60 males.

The median income for a household in the county was $51,899, and the median income for a family was $57,025. Males had a median income of $41,480 versus $27,807 for females. The per capita income for the county was $25,019.  About 3.40% of families and 5.60% of the population were below the poverty line, including 5.60% of those under age 18 and 5.70% of those age 65 or over.

Politics

Park County is consistently Republican. It has not voted for the Democratic nominee for President since Lyndon B. Johnson in 1964.

Communities

Towns
Alma
Fairplay

Census-designated place
Guffey

 Hartsel

Other unincorporated communities

Bailey
Como
Grant
Jefferson
Lake George
Shawnee
Tarryall

Ghost towns
Antero Junction
Buckskin Joe (Also known as Laurette or Lauret)
Garo
Tarryall
Trump

In popular culture
In the long-running animated television series South Park, the eponymous fictional town is situated in an unspecified part of the county.

Notable people
Gottlieb Fluhmann (Gottlieb Fluhmann disappeared in 1892 and his remains were found in a secluded cave in Park County in 1944. The cause of his death remains unknown).
Samuel Hartsel
John J. Hoover
Sheldon Jackson

See also

Arapahoe County, Kansas Territory
Colorado census statistical areas
Denver-Aurora-Boulder Combined Statistical Area
Front Range Urban Corridor
Index of Colorado-related articles
National Register of Historic Places listings in Park County, Colorado
Outline of Colorado
Park County, Jefferson Territory

References

External links

Park County Government website

South Park National Heritage Area
Colorado County Evolution by Don Stanwyck
Colorado Historical Society
Geologic Map of the Harvard Lakes 7.5ʹ Quadrangle, Park and Chaffee Counties, Colorado United States Geological Survey
Gerald Fogarty Galloway Collection of Records Concerning Mines and Real Property in Park County, Colorado. Yale Collection of Western Americana, Beinecke Rare Book and Manuscript Library.
Colorado Election Results 2020

1861 establishments in Colorado Territory
Colorado counties
 
Populated places established in 1861